The Somaliland National Armed Forces are the military services of Republic of Somaliland. The Somaliland National Armed Forces consist of the Somaliland National Army, the Somaliland Coast Guard, the Somaliland Police Force, the Somaliland Custodial Corps, the Somaliland Immigration and Border Control and the Somaliland Fire Brigade. There is no air force.

The Armed Forces is under the command of President Muse Bihi Abdi, who is the Commander-in-chief. Minister of Defence Abdiqani Mohamoud Aateye is the designated minister that oversees the armed forces.

Somaliland has 85 T-54/55 tanks, 6 armoured fighting vehicles, 100-200 rocket projectors, and has 45 pieces of artillery in its national army, and 100,000 soldiers. Somaliland has over 200 police cars and other vehicles in its police force as well as 22,000 police officers. Somaliland has 7 defender class boats and 1 coast guard vessels in its coast guard, and 1,000 naval officers.

Somaliland spends $115 million budget on its armed forces, its largest government expenditure. Due to a United Nations arms embargo on Somalia, the state is not allowed to procure weapons.

History

Protectorate period 

In 1914, the Somaliland Camel Corps was formed in British Somaliland and saw service before, during, and after the Italian invasion of the territory during World War II.

In 1942, the Somaliland Scouts were tasked with defending the reserve.

Independence and Union with Somalia 
Somaliland became independent on 26 June 1960 as the State of Somaliland, and the Trust Territory of Somalia (the former Italian Somaliland) followed suit five days later. On 1 July 1960, the two territories united to form the Somali Republic.

After independence, the Somaliland Scouts merged with the former Dervishes to form the 5,000 strong Somali National Army.

War of Independence 

In 1981, the Somali National Movement was one of the first rebel groups to form in the country.

Then Somali dictator Siad Barre accused them of being separatist groups and ordered the extermination of the Isaaq tribe, to which the rebel group belonged. The movement fought a guerrilla war in the northwest of the country with the aim of overthrowing and replacing the military government. After the dictator's defeat and special developments in 1991, the Somali sultans decided to abolish unity in 1960 and declared Somaliland an independent state.

Restoration of sovereignty 

In 1991, after Somaliland reasserted its sovereignty, the new government faced great problems with armed groups and armed clans, who were boycotting roads to earn a living.

The new government launched the Somaliland peace process jointly with the Somali National Movement. The communities in Somaliland negotiated what led to the Great Reconciliation Conference in Borama in 1993 which allowed the transfer of power from the Somali National Movement. An interim government for a new civil administration, paving the way for democratic governance and stability.

After a civilian government led by Muhammad Haji Ibrahim Egal disarmed armed clans and armed groups and recruited armed forces from all over Somaliland.

The Armed Forces of Somaliland was officially established on 2 February 1994.

Border War 

In 1998 Puntland State of Somalia claimed Somaliland territory on the basis of clan kinship with some Somaliland communities in the eastern regions of Sool and Sanaag. Which led to tribal and armed conflicts, as a result, The armed forces of Somaliland withdrew from some cities in the eastern regions to avoid casualties until 2007 when the Somaliland communities in the eastern regions demanded that they intervene.

Commanders

Army

Personnel
The sub of Somaliland army in Somaliland has long operated without a formal rank structure. However, in December 2012, Somaliland defense ministry announced that a chain of command had been developed and which was implemented in January 2013.

Equipment
When the former Somali dictator Siad Barre was ousted in 1991, Somaliland inherited the military equipment, hardware and facilities that was left behind by the previous Somali Democratic Republic.

Due to a United Nations arms embargo on Somalia, which the semi-autonomous Somaliland region is internationally recognized as being a part of, the territory is not allowed to purchase weapons. Consequently, military officials from the region rely on repairing and modifying old equipment. Some also claim that weapons are at times delivered from Ethiopia and Yemen via the port of Berbera, usually during the night.

Regular Somaliland soldiers have been seen with SKS carbines (for parades) and various versions of the AK-47.

Vehicles and Equipment 

 Tanks
 T-55A (Main Battle Tank)
 T-54B (Main Battle Tank)
 T-72B (date unknown) (Main Battle Tank) 
 Armoured Personnel Carriers
 Fiat 6614
 Fiat 6616 (Turret - 20mm)
 Transport Vehicles
 Iveco LMV (4x4)
 Renault GBC-180 (6×6)
 M939 Truck (6×6)
 Toyota Landcruiser J79
 Toyota Hilux
 Nissan Frontier
 Ford F350 (Armoured Gun Truck)
 Humvee 
 Self-Propelled Artillery
  BM-21 Grad (Multiple Rocket Launcher - 122mm)
 Humvee (Multiple Rocket Launcher)
  D-44 (Artillery - 85mm)
 Mortar
  M-224 (Mortar - 60mm)
  M1938 (Mortar - 120mm)
 Anti-Aircraft Gun
  ZU-23-2 (Twin-barreled anti-aircraft gun - 23mm)

Coast Guard

The Somaliland Coast Guard was formed in 2009. The headquarters is located in the coastal town of Berbera; a diving center run by foreign divers who train the Somaliland coast guard is also located there. The coast guard operates with small speedboats mounted with guns.  Much of this equipment was provided by the United Kingdom, in an effort to combat piracy.

Ranks 

Officers

Enlisted

Gallery

See also

National Service (Somaliland)

References

 British government funded Somaliland Security Programme

Military in Somaliland
1993 establishments in Somaliland
Military units and formations established in 1993
Factions in the Somali Civil War